Surabhi Kamalabai (1913–1977) was an Indian actress who worked in Telugu theatre and Telugu cinema. She has the distinction of being the first Telugu actress in a talkie film with Bhakta Prahlada (1932), directed by H. M. Reddy. She played the role of Leelavathi, the wife of Hiranyakasipa. Since then she acted in about 30 films, including Savitri (1933), Pathala Bhairavi (1951), Malliswari (1951), Illarikam (1959) and Velugu Needalu (1961).

She belongs to the well esteemed Surabhi drama company, in which drama is not only a livelihood but a profession and an art form. There were about 50 drama families during the 1920s to 1950s in Andhra Pradesh. They toured different places, stayed for some time and gave a series of programmes in the nearby towns.

Filmography

 Bhakta Prahlada (1931) as Leelavathi (debut)
 Rama Paduka Pattabhishekam (1932) as Goddess Seetha
 Shakuntala (1932/I) as Shakuntala
 Pruthvi Putra (1933)
 Savithri (1933)
 Shaher Ka Jadoo (1934) as Laila
 Be Kharab Jan (1936)
 Do Diwane (1936)
 Draupadi Manasamrakshanam (1936)
 Bhakta Jayadeva (1938)
 Tukaram (1938)
 Bhookailas (1940) as Vishnu Maya
 Patni (1942)
 Keelugurram (1949)
 Malliswari (1951)
 Patala Bhairavi (1951)
 Mangala (1951)
 Kathal (1952)
 Manavati (1952)
 Rohini (1953)
 Devadasu (1953)
 Vayyari Bhama (1953)
 Pelli Naati Pramanalu (1958)
 Mangalya Balam (1958)
 Jayabheri (1959)
 Illarikam (1959)
 Vagdanam (1961) as Bujjamma
 Velugu Needalu (1964)

References

Indian film actresses
1913 births
1977 deaths
20th-century Indian actresses
Indian stage actresses
Actresses in Telugu cinema
Actresses in Telugu theatre
Date of birth missing
Date of death missing